James J. Walker (May 13, 1918 – October 1, 1975) was an American college football player and coach. He served as the head football coach at Central State University in Wilberforce, Ohio from 1957 to 1964 and 1967 to 1971.

Born in Macon, Georgia, Walker graduated Washington High School in South Bend, Indiana before attending the University of Iowa, where he played football for the Iowa Hawkeyes under head coach Eddie Anderson.  After service in the United States Coast Guard during World War II and two years playing professional football with the Oakland Giants, Walker joined the coaching staff at Central State as an assistant to Gaston F. Lewis before succeeding Lewis as head football coach in 1957.  He was also an assistant professor in the Department of Health and Physical Education at Central State and briefly coached the school's baseball team.  Walker died on October 1, 1975 at Green Memorial Hospital, in Xenia, Ohio, following a brief illness.

References

1918 births
1975 deaths
American football tackles
Central State Marauders baseball coaches
Central State Marauders football coaches
Central State University faculty
Iowa Hawkeyes football players
United States Coast Guard personnel of World War II
Sportspeople from Macon, Georgia
Players of American football from South Bend, Indiana
African-American coaches of American football
African-American players of American football
20th-century African-American sportspeople